Zhu Dening (born 15 July 1999) is a Chinese Paralympic athlete. He represented China at the 2020 Summer Paralympics.

Career
Dening represented China in the men's 100 metres T38 event at the 2020 Summer Paralympics and won a silver medal.

References

1999 births
Living people
People from Xiamen
Paralympic athletes of China
Athletes (track and field) at the 2020 Summer Paralympics
Medalists at the 2020 Summer Paralympics
Paralympic silver medalists for China
Paralympic medalists in athletics (track and field)
Chinese male sprinters
Chinese male long jumpers
21st-century Chinese people